Oak Grove Cemetery may refer to:

 Oak Grove Cemetery (Conway, Arkansas), listed on the NRHP in Conway, Arkansas
 Oak Grove Cemetery (Des Arc, Arkansas), listed on the NRHP in Prairie County, Arkansas
 Oak Grove Cemetery (Jerseyville, Illinois)
 Oak Grove Cemetery (Fall River, Massachusetts), listed on the NRHP
 Oak Grove Cemetery (Falmouth, Massachusetts)
 Oak Grove Cemetery (Gloucester, Massachusetts), listed on the NRHP
 Oak Grove Cemetery (Lexington, Virginia)
 Oak Grove Cemetery (New Bedford, Massachusetts), listed on the NRHP

See also
 Oak Grove-Freedman's Cemetery, Salisbury, North Carolina, listed on the NRHP